Tayozhny is a rural locality (a settlement) in Yugo-Kamskoye Rural Settlement, Permsky District, Perm Krai, Russia. The population was 86 as of 2010. There are 5 streets.

Geography 
Tayozhny is located 58 km southwest of Perm (the district's administrative centre) by road. Verkh-Yug is the nearest rural locality.

References 

Rural localities in Permsky District